Amberlynn Weber (born 1993) is an American Paralympic track and fielder. At the 2011 Parapan American Games, she won gold medals in 100 m, 400 m, and 800 m and a bronze medal in 200 m.

References

External links 

 
 

1993 births
Living people
Paralympic track and field athletes of the United States
Athletes (track and field) at the 2012 Summer Paralympics
Sportspeople from Missoula, Montana
People with paraplegia
Medalists at the 2011 Parapan American Games